Malvina is a feminine given name derived from the Gaelic, invented by the Scottish poet James Macpherson.

Malvina may also refer to:

 Malvina, Mississippi
 Malvina, an opera by Nicola Vaccai
 Malvina, A shipwreck off the Yorkshire coast

See also

 Gran Malvina, Spanish name for the island West Falkland
 Malvinas (disambiguation)
 Malvinas Argentinas (disambiguation)
 
 
 Falkland (disambiguation)